Juliomys is a genus of South American rodents of the family Cricetidae. Five species are known, all found in Argentina and Brazil. They are as follows:
Juliomys anoblepas (extinct)
Juliomys ossitenuis
Juliomys pictipes (Lesser Wilfred's mouse)
Juliomys rimofrons (Cleft-headed juliomys)
Juliomys ximenezi (Aracuaria Forest tree mouse)

References